Robyn Kathryn Geraghty (born 8 August 1949) was the Labor member for the electoral district of Torrens in South Australia from 1994 to 2014. She was elected at a by-election held in 1994 to replace Joe Tiernan who had died in office.

Geraghty has been heavily involved in community issues, as well as introducing various acts into parliament. She was also her party's parliamentary whip.

The 2006 election saw Geraghty increase her margin to 19.1%.

Geraghty did not re-contest her seat at the 2014 election.

References

External links
 
 Poll Bludger article
 

1949 births
Living people
Members of the South Australian House of Assembly
21st-century Australian politicians
21st-century Australian women politicians
Women members of the South Australian House of Assembly